Dr. K. G. Adiyodi (2 January 1927  22 October 1987) was an Indian politician from Kerala, India. He was the Minister for Finance, Forest and food, Government of Kerala. He was elected to the Kerala Legislative Assembly from Perambra and Kalpetta.

Personal life 
Dr. K. G. Adiyodi was born to Chandu Kidav and Madhavi Amma. He was a medical practitioner. He was married to Madhavikutty Amma. Established hospital.

Positions held 
 Minister for Food and Forest (25-09-1971 to 15 May 1972)
 Minister for Finance (16-05-1972 to 25 December 1975)
 Minister for Forest and Irrigation (26-02-1975 to 25 March 1977)
 Member Lok Sabha (1984–1987)
 Member of All India Congress Committee AICC
 Chairman, Kerala Public Service Commission KPSC
 President, (Acting) Kerala Pradesh Congress Committee KPCC

References

1927 births
1987 deaths
Indian politicians
Indian National Congress politicians from Kerala
Indian Hindus
India MPs 1984–1989
Ministry of Finance (India)
Kerala politicians
Lok Sabha members from Kerala